Sankt Andrä is a town in the district of Wolfsberg in Carinthia in Austria. It is named after Saint Andrew.

Landmarks
The main church is the former Saint Andrew's Cathedral, until 1829 the bishop's seat of the Diocese of Lavant.

Population

References

External links 
 Pictures of St. Andrä

Cities and towns in Wolfsberg District